Agraeciini is a large tribe of bush crickets or katydids in the conehead subfamily, Conocephalinae.

Subtribes and genera
The Orthoptera Species File lists:

Subtribe Agraeciina
Auth: Redtenbacher, 1891 – Central-South America, Papua New Guinea
 Agraecia Serville, 1831
 Iaratrox Chamorro-Rengifo & Lopes-Andrade, 2015
 Starkonsa Chamorro-Rengifo & Lopes-Andrade, 2015
 Yvelinula Chamorro-Rengifo & Lopes-Andrade, 2015

Subtribe Eumegalodontina
Auth: Brongniart, 1892 – Malesia
 Ellatodon Caudell, 1927
 Lesina Walker, 1869

Subtribe Liarina
Auth: Ingrisch, 1998 – India and Indochina to western Australia

 Acrodonta Redtenbacher, 1891
 Amacroxiphus Ingrisch, 1998
 Anelytra Redtenbacher, 1891
 Bispinolakis Ingrisch, 1998
 Eppioides Hebard, 1922
 Eumacroxiphus Ingrisch, 1998
 Gonatacanthus Karny, 1907
 Goodangarkia Rentz, 2009
 Jambiliara Ingrisch, 1998
 Labugama Henry, 1932
 Liara Redtenbacher, 1891
 Liaromorpha Gorochov, 1994
 Lichnofugia Ingrisch, 1998
 Lubuksia Ingrisch, 1998
 Macroxiphus Pictet, 1888
 Odontoconus Fritze, 1908
 Oxystethus Redtenbacher, 1891
 Peracca Griffini, 1897
 Pseudacrodonta Ingrisch, 1998
 Pseudosubria Karny, 1926
 Rhynchocerus Karsch, 1896
 Rhytidogyne Karny, 1907
 Sacculiphallus Ingrisch, 1998
 Scytocera Redtenbacher, 1891
 Scytoceroides Henry, 1932
 Sialaiana Ingrisch, 1998
 Viriacca Ingrisch, 1998

Subtribe Oxylakina
Auth: Ingrisch, 1998 – India, Indochina, Malesia
 Depressacca Ingrisch, 1998
 Ischnophyllus Redtenbacher, 1891
 Kirkaldyus Griffini, 1908
 Nahlaksia Ingrisch, 1998
 Oxylakis Redtenbacher, 1891
 Paragraecia Karny, 1907
 Paroxylakis Ingrisch, 1998
 Tabangacris Willemse, 1966

Subtribe Salomonina
Auth: Brongniart, 1897 – Indochina, Philippines, Malesia to Australasia
 Ingrischia Naskrecki & Rentz, 2010
 Paranicsara Ingrisch, 1998
 Salomona Blanchard, 1853
 Trichophallus Ingrisch, 1998

Subtribe incertae sedis
Genus group Axylus Ingrisch, 2015
 Anthracites Redtenbacher, 1891
 Axylus Stål, 1877
 Eucoptaspis Willemse, 1966
 Eulobaspis Ingrisch, 2015
 Heminicsara Karny, 1912

Other genera

References

 Chamorro-Rengifo, J., Braun, H. & Lopes-Andrade, C. 2015. Reassessment and division of the genus Agraecia Audinet-Serville (Orthoptera: Tettigoniidae: Conocephalinae: Agraeciini). Zootaxa 3993 (1): 1–76. 
 Chamorro-Rengifo, J., Braun, H. & Lopes-Andrade, C. 2015. JULIANA CHAMORRO-RENGIFO, HOLGER BRAUN & CRISTIANO LOPES-ANDRADE (2015) REASSESSMENT AND DIVISION OF THE GENUS AGRAECIA AUDINET-SERVILLE (ORTHOPTERA: TETTIGONIIDAE: CONOCEPHALINAE: AGRAECIINI). Zootaxa, 3993(1): 001–076. Zootaxa 4032 (5): 600–600. 
 Gorochov, A.V. 2007: A new species of Liaromorpha Gor. from Cambodia (Orthoptera: Tettigoniidae: Conocephalinae). Zoosystematica rossica, 16(2): 208. 
 Gorochov, A.V., 2011: Taxonomy of the katydids (Orthoptera: Tettigoniidae) from east Asia and adjacent islands. Communication 2. Far Eastern Entomologist 227: 1-12.
 Naskrecki, P.; Rentz, D.C.F. 2010: Studies in the orthopteran fauna of Melanesia: new katydids of the tribe Agraeciini from Papua New Guinea (Orthoptera: Tettigoniidae: Conocephalinae). Zootaxa, 2664: 1-35.
 Tan, M.K.; Ingrisch, S. 2014: New taxa and notes of some described species of Agraeciini (Orthoptera: Tettigoniidae: Conocephalinae) from Malay Peninsula. Zootaxa 3765 (6): 541–556. 
 Tan, M.K., Ingrisch, S. & Kamaruddin, K.N. 2015. A new species of spine-headed katydid Mesagraecia Ingrisch, 1998 (Conocephalinae: Agraeciini), with key to species. Zootaxa 4057 (3): 437–443. 

Orthoptera tribes
Conocephalinae